Sand Dollar Beach is a  long beach in Big Sur, California, one of the longest publicly accessible beaches on that coast. It is within the Los Padres National Forest and across  Highway 1 from Plaskett Creek Campground. There is a picnic area, bathrooms, and barbeque pits at the parking area. There is a $10 access fee payable at the parking lot managed by a concession company. Dogs are permitted on leash while on the trail and off leash at the beach. Beach access is open daily from sunrise to sunset and is only available for day use. Swimming and wading are not recommended due to dangerous surf conditions and strong rip currents.

There is a  access trail through a row of Monterey pines to a trail running along the top of a grassy bluff. There are views along the seaside bluff with long views up and down the coast. It is popular with hikers and photographers due to its breathtaking bluffs. A steep   trail leads from the bluff to a wooden staircase that descends the final  down to the beach. A short trail to the south leads to an overlook guarded by a wooden railing. It is possible to see whales migrating along the coast during certain parts of the year. A large white sea stack named Plaskett Rock is visible, offshore from Plaskett Rock Point, the headland that separates Sand Dollar Beach from Jade Cove. Cone Peak in the Santa Lucia Mountains is visible to the northeast. 

References 

Beaches of Monterey County, California
Beaches of Northern California
Big Sur
Monterey County, California